Gishu (also Romanized as Gīshū) is a village in Rudbar Rural District, Ruydar District, Khamir County, Hormozgan Province, Iran. At the 2006 census, its population was 211, in 56 families.

References 

Populated places in Khamir County